Francisco Javier Varela Salas (born 1952 in Puertollano, Spain) is a Spanish Army general. He was the Chief of Staff of the Army from 2017 to 2021.

He was enrolled in the Army in 1978 after he graduated from General Military Academy, Zaragoza and was commissioned as 2nd lieutenant. He was moved to Special Operations Company No. 41, Barcelona. He was promoted to captain and served in the Military School of Mountain and Special Operations then as a teacher.

He attended the Army Staff College in 1990, and he was made lieutenant colonel to served in Rapid Action Force from which he later commands the Legion's XIX Special Operations Flag until 2003. He also participated in the UNPROFOR in 1992 and was made a member of KFOR Kosovo in 2001. When he was made colonel, he served in the Operations Command and Light Forces HQ in 2005. He was chief general of the Legion's Brigade "Rey Alfonso XIII" II in 2009 until 2011 and chief of the Light Forces Command until 2014.

Commands 
He was made chief general of Land Force after promotion to lieutenant general in 2014, and he became head of the High Availability Land HQ Bétera, Valencia until 2017.

References

External links 

 

Living people
1952 births
People from Puertollano
Grand Crosses of the Royal and Military Order of San Hermenegild
Order of Civil Merit members
Officiers of the Légion d'honneur